Rahul Singh (born 12 September 1992) is an Indian first-class cricketer who plays for Services.

References

External links
 

1992 births
Living people
Indian cricketers
Himachal Pradesh cricketers
Services cricketers
People from Kaithal
Cricketers from Haryana